Bhuee/Bhooi/Bhui/Bhooee/Bhuopolus is an Indian caste. In India, Bhuee are categorized as Vishwakarmas, or in North India as Tarkhan (Punjab)/Ramgarhia clan found in Punjab (India), mostly in Jalandhar, Mohali, Kartarpur, Amritsar, and Chandigarh.

References

Punjabi tribes
Sikh communities
Social groups of Punjab, India
Ramgarhia clans
Sikh names